The 1922 Harvard Crimson football team represented Harvard University in the 1922 college football season. The Crimson finished with a 7–2 record under fourth-year head coach Bob Fisher.  Walter Camp selected one Harvard player, guard Charles J. Hubbard, as a first-team member of his 1922 College Football All-America Team. Halfback George Owen was selected by Camp as a second-team All-American and was later inducted into the College Football Hall of Fame.

Schedule

References

Harvard
Harvard Crimson football seasons
Harvard Crimson football
1920s in Boston